Basahan script, also known as Guhit,  is the native name used by Bicolanos to refer to Baybayin.

The word Basahan is already recorded in a book entitled Vocabulario de la Lengua Bicol by Marcos de Lisboa in 1628 which states that it has three vowels and fifteen consonants.

Alphabet

Basahan has three stand-alone vowels (a, e/i, o/u) and fifteen consonants (ba, ka, da, ga, ha, la, ma, na, nga, pa, ra, sa, ta, wa, ya). This script can be called an abugida because signs represent syllables, that is a consonant with a vowel.

Way of writing

According to Scott, when e.g. the sign for ba has to be read as be / bi it has a kaldit (a small "v" shaped diacritic sign) on the left (or above), if it has to be read as bu / bo the kaldit is on the right (resp. below). The  of the older bikolanos has an own sign for /r/ while the basahans of Tagalog (Baybayin) and Ilokano (Kurdita) have not. In his time the kaldit was called  or  according to Marcos de Lisboa, author of the earliest dictionary of Bikol.

Reference

External links
 sample of Basahan script font
 Basahan

Writing systems
Philippine scripts